Vendetta for the Saint is a 1964 mystery novel featuring the character of Simon Templar, alias "The Saint". Vendetta for the Saint was the first full-length Saint novel published since The Saint Sees it Through, 18 years earlier. A television adaptation of the novel was released as a theatrical film, also entitled Vendetta for the Saint, in 1969.

Development
The novel is credited to Leslie Charteris, who created the Saint in 1928, but the book was actually authored by Harry Harrison, a noted science fiction author who also wrote the syndicated Saint comic strip. Although Harrison wrote the majority of the book as a ghost writer, he indicates in an interview that Charteris did contribute to the final book (albeit in a very minor way)..

The reference work The Saint: A Complete History by Burl Barer, however, indicates that Charteris was heavily involved in editing the book. Vendetta was the first Saint volume published after Charteris chose to step back from actively writing the adventures, and were followed by a number of books credited to Charteris but actually written by other authors. Charteris remained as editor of the books, approving stories and revising material when needed. These books were mostly based upon teleplays from the TV series or scenarios from the comic strip; the next wholly original Saint literary stories were not published until the novella collection Catch the Saint more than a decade later.

Plot summary
The story is set on the island of Sicily, where the Saint is confronted with the Italian Mafia. The story shows a slightly older, more mature Saint. Although still a formidable opponent for any criminal, he will not storm into action but choose his moments more carefully.

At the beginning, Simon Templar is on holiday in Naples when a small uproar on a lunch table draws his attention. An English tourist attempts to greet an Italian businessman as an old friend, but the Italian refuses to acknowledge the greeting and claims never to have met him. When the bodyguard of the businessman attacks the Englishman, the Saint intervenes and immobilizes the bodyguard. The Italians make their retreat and the Saint and the Englishman make their introductions to each other. The Englishman, Euston, claims that the Italian Businessman was his old friend Dino Cartelli. When Euston takes his leave, the Saint gives the incident no second thought.

The next morning, the Saint's attention is drawn by an obituary in the local newspaper of an English tourist by the name of Euston. Apparently the man had an unfortunate accident. Remembering the previous day's incident, the Saint is unable to accept this and starts an investigation into the identity of the businessman. He discovers that Dino Cartelli was known as a faithful bank employee, who was brutally murdered by bank robbers. Apparently, his face and hands were mutilated beyond recognition. He also learns that the businessman with the bodyguard goes by the name of Alessandro Destamio.

The next day, a limousine stops at the hotel and the Saint is courteously invited to have a meeting with Mr. Destamio. He is flown to Destamio's private island, and Destamio introduces himself as a businessman with many enemies who takes his privacy very seriously.

When back in Naples, the Saint is attacked by a street robber. He simply neutralizes the man, but both he and the robber are brought to a police station for questioning. The Saint receives an extremely cool reception by the police officials, who ask him why he has mutilated an Italian citizen. Luckily for the Saint, a higher ranked inspector by the name of Ponti shows up, who discards the Saint without hesitation and even recommends him a good restaurant for lunch.
After leaving the station, the Saint goes to the indicated restaurant because he realizes the recommendation by Ponti was a hidden invitation. There the two men meet. Ponti reveals to the Saint the true nature of his troubles: he faces war with the notorious Mafia. They will try to hunt him down and the police cannot be trusted. Ponti will be his only ally.

The next move of the Saint is to visit the family of Destamio, including the lovely Gina Destamio. At night, he visits the mausoleum of the Destamio family, but before he can investigate the grave inscriptions he is clubbed unconscious.

The Saint finds himself captured in a castle, at the mercy of the Mafia. Before Destamio can question him he is brought to the head of the Mafia, who is seriously ill. It appears Destamio aims to be his successor, but he has to defeat other candidates who wonder why Destamio has brought the Saint to their headquarters. It appears that Destamio claims to be from a worthy family, which the Saint might dispute.

After being brought back to his cell, the Saint manages to untie his ropes and climbs out of the antique dungeon. Pursued by several gangsters, he descends from the castle hill and starts running through the Italian countryside. During the chase, the Saint has brief encounters with locals who help him, but their fear of the Mafia is all-apparent. A local barber manages to conceal him and tells him to leave as soon as possible. Bus passengers on the Palermo bus stay clear of him, realizing he is on the Mafia's hit list.

The Saint manages to reach Palermo and contacts Ponti. Then the tables can be turned. Ponti has mobilised a secret military strike force, ready for battle and very grateful to learn from the Saint the location of the Mafia headquarters.

The Saint joins the small army when they attack the castle. Although the castle is surrounded, the Mafia succeeds in breaking through the perimeter with a bullet-proof car. The army commander and the Saint and Ponti start the pursuit. When they cross through Palermo, they discover they have chased the car too long and the head men must have sneaked out. When driving back, the Saint leaves the car and sends Ponti to call reinforcements.

The Saint enters the house were the Mafia top men have gathered. He is able to corner them, but before he can thoroughly question Destamio he is again surprised by one of the guards. After that the army troops arrive and although several top men are arrested, Destamio again escapes through a back garage.

The Saint realizes he can only go to one other place and sets off for the Destamio mansion. There he finally confronts Destamio, who is trying to gather his personal belongings before going under. Confronted by the Saint, he admits his real name is Dino Cartelli. He offers the Saint a bribe in return for his freedom. The Saint lets him go, straight into the hands of arriving police troops.

In other media

Television
Vendetta for the Saint was adapted as a two-part episode of The Saint, and was broadcast during the programme's final season on January 5 and 12, 1969. Roger Moore played Simon Templar. After the series ended, the two episodes were edited together as a movie that was distributed theatrically in Europe and was also released to TV and, much later, home video.

The TV series adapted a number of Charteris' original Saint stories and novels during its run; Vendetta for the Saint was the last of these adaptations to be broadcast, and the only one not based upon a solo Charteris work. It is also one of only four full-length novels to be adapted for the series.

Location shooting took place in Malta, for the producers were afraid of shooting a movie with a Mafia theme on location in Naples or Sicily.

References

External links
 Harry Harrison official homepage - information about Vendetta for the Saint
 

1964 American novels
Simon Templar books
American novels adapted into television shows
British novels adapted into television shows
1964 British novels
Novels by Harry Harrison
Novels set in Sicily
Doubleday (publisher) books
1964 debut novels